Randall E. Auxier (born August 7, 1961) is a professor of philosophy and communication studies at Southern Illinois University Carbondale, a musician, environmental activist, union advocate, and candidate (2018) for the United States House of Representatives, nominated by the Green Party in the 12th Congressional District of Illinois. He is a radio host for WDBX Carbondale since 2001, a widely read author of popular philosophy, and also a co-founder and co-director of the AIPCT (The American Institute for Philosophical and Cultural Thought).

Born in Leitchfield, Kentucky, Auxier is the younger of two children, the son of a veterinarian, Charles David Auxier (1931-) and a professional church musician, Eileen Gunter Auxier (1933-2016). Educated in the public schools of Memphis, Tennessee, he grew up during and was deeply affected by, the civil rights movement. He was one of the many students who were bused to integrated schools by court orders that resulted from Brown v. Board of Education. Auxier was in first grade when Martin Luther King Jr. was assassinated, and the event had a continual impact on him and the region he lived in.

In philosophy, Auxier specializes in classical American thought, process metaphysics and theology, intensive logics, aesthetics, philosophical anthropology, and the philosophy of culture, of science, of religion, and of education. He teaches and writes on Giambattista Vico, Immanuel Kant, Georg Hegel, J.J. Bachofen, Charles Peirce, Henri Bergson, Josiah Royce, William James, John Dewey, Alfred North Whitehead, Ernst Cassirer, Susanne Langer, Charles Hartshorne, Jaakko Hintikka, Arthur Danto, and Umberto Eco.

Education and career 
Auxier attended Graves Road Elementary School (1967–73), Graceland Junior High School (1973–76), and Hillcrest High School (1976-79), all belonging to the Memphis City Schools. Court ordered busing commenced in January 1973, and Auxier remained (by his own choosing) in public schools while most of his white schoolmates were sent to all-white private schools.  Auxier attended Memphis State University (now called the University of Memphis) from 1979 to 1981, majoring in Criminal Justice. He left school in the fall of 1981, playing bass guitar and singing professionally in several local bands. He returned to Memphis State in the fall of 1984 and received an undergraduate degree in philosophy and criminal justice (magna cum laude) in 1986. He was awarded an assistantship at Memphis State to pursue a master's degree in philosophy, and began teaching in 1987. The MA was completed in 1988. He went on to receive a fellowship and assistantship to pursue doctoral work at Emory University, completing the Ph.D. in 1992. His dissertation examined the theories of signs and symbols that applied to the language of metaphysics, discussing principally the works of Cassirer, Langer, Peirce, and Eco.

In the fall of 1992 he became assistant professor and chair (1992–97) of the philosophy department at Oklahoma City University, and was the founding director of the OCU Institute of Liberal Arts (1994–99). While at OCU, he also taught philosophy courses for several years at the nearby public high school Classen School of Advanced Studies. In 2000, he accepted a position at Southern Illinois University Carbondale, in the philosophy department, where he remains. While he maintains his affiliation with the philosophy department at SIUC, his primary assignment moved to the department of communications studies in the fall of 2017.

In 2016, Auxier was a visiting professor at the American Studies Center of the University of Warsaw, and in 2017 and 2018, he was visiting professor of philosophy in the Institute of Philosophy of the university or Warsaw.

The Pluralist 
Auxier's interest in philosophical personalism led him to become editor of The Personalist Forum in 1997. The original publisher, Mercer University Press, dropped the publication that year, and Auxier was obliged to raise funds to keep the publication afloat until 2005, when the University of Illinois Press took on the publishing responsibilities for the journal. It was at this time that the title of the journal changed to The Pluralist and gained monetary support from both Oklahoma State University and Southern Illinois University Carbondale. At that time John Shook and Scott Gelfand from OSU became co-editors. After five years of publishing under the new name, The Pluralist became the official journal of the Society for the Advancement of American Philosophy in 2010. After this transition, Auxier continued to edit the journal until 2012.

The Library of Living Philosophers 
In 2001, Auxier was appointed editor of the Library of Living Philosophers, the third in its history, following series founder Paul Arthur Schilpp (1938–1981), and Lewis Edwin Hahn (1981–2001). This series is important to scholars because it provides an opportunity to critics and supporters of a valuable philosophical figure to address the thinker, while still alive, regarding any problems or ambiguities that may have arisen around his or her thought over the course of his or her career. The central thinker then responds to these questions or concerns, and, thus, the volume provides the opportunity for a final and definitive discussion regarding the thought of a world-renowned contemporary philosopher. The series has a highly esteemed reputation as a fine scholarly publication, and it is known for its impeccable editing.

During his editorship, Auxier worked with and completed volumes on Seyyed Hossein Nasr (2001), Marjorie Grene (2003), Jaakko Hintikka (2006), Michael Dummett (2007), Richard Rorty (2010), and Arthur C. Danto (2013). Figures whose volumes were completed after 2013 but for which Auxier was principal editor include Hilary Putnam and Umberto Eco. He initiated a volume on Julia Kristeva which is in progress.

The American Institute for Philosophical and Cultural Thought 
In November 2016, in response to the decision of Southern Illinois University Carbondale to dismiss all staff and cease all projects of the Center for Dewey Studies, Auxier, along with John R. Shook and Larry A. Hickman (Director Emeritus of the Center for Dewey Studies) founded the American Institute of Philosophical and Cultural Thought. It is a federal 501 (c) (3) private foundation and is registered in the State of Illinois as a charitable organization. AIPCT dedicated to the continuation of the work of the Dewey Center, to the greatest extent possible, as well as to a broad range of other cultural and scholarly activities. It holds some 30,000 volumes specialized in American thought along with the papers of a number of distinguished philosophers and theologians of the 20th century. There are regular programs, seminars, public lectures, as well as fellowships and grants for long-term research and residency. AIPCT is affiliated with several scholarly organizations, including the Institute of American Religious and Philosophical Thought and the Foundation for the Philosophy of Creativity and works closely with the Special Collections Research Center of the Morris Library at Southern Illinois University Carbondale.

Works 
Auxier has authored or co-authored many lectures and presentations around the United States and in other countries, has written many scholarly articles, book chapters, encyclopedia entries, and translations. He edited numerous books. Subjects on which he has published range from John Dewey and Alfred North Whitehead to the limits of evolution, biker bars, and rock music. His recent work includes Time, Will and Purpose: Living Ideas from the Philosophy of Josiah Royce, (Open Court 2013); Metaphysical Graffiti: Deep Cuts in the Philosophy of Rock (Open Court 2017), and, with Gary L. Herstein, The Quantum of Explanation: Whitehead's Radical Empiricism (Routledge, 2017). Auxier's journalism includes articles and book reviews for the Carbondale Nightlife and the Carbondale Times, and he authored articles and fiction for Empirical Magazine while it was operating. Auxier writes a regular blog for Radically Empirical, an online magazine that features essays and commentary on current and literary affairs. Auxier's creative works also include short stories, occasional poetry, and three music CDs.

Auxier's areas of specialization are American philosophy, post-Kantian continental philosophy, process and systematic philosophy/theology, history of philosophy, metaphysics, moral philosophy, theology, political theory, and philosophy of education. He has been awarded the Jacobsen Prize in Process Metaphysics from the International Society for Universalism and the Douglas Greenlee Prize from the Society for the Advancement of American Philosophy.

Metaphysics and formal philosophy 
Auxier defends a version of process-relational metaphysics called “analogical realism.” Built from his theory of analogy first articulated in his 1992 dissertation, he argues that the language of metaphysics should be divided into operational language and functional language. The former is “semiotic” and the latter “symbolic.” Semiotic metaphysical language is synchronic and derives from a prior act of spatialization in the symbolic domain. Semiotic, operational language analogizes terms by extracting relations between base term pairings that find comparison or contrast in the relations of their analogate pairings (i.e., four-term analogies that reveal relations of relations along three axes). These may be expressed as ordered pairs for some purposes, but the semiotic system of reasoning is non-monotonic and yields to W.V. Quine's critiques of under-determination and radical translation. The mode of reasoning is extensional in semiotics and can be articulated (incompletely) in extensional logics of the sort devised by Gottlob Frege, Bertrand Russell, and Alfred North Whitehead. Symbolic language in metaphysics conveys meaning through three-term analogies in which a single base term is concretely differentiated through concrete, temporal processes. Such processes are brought to language by poetic insight which provide the “basis phenomena” (Cassirer's term) of human experience. These primal symbols are active and uncompletable, corresponding to “ideas” where signs correspond to “concepts,” a distinction drawn from Immanuel Kant's terminology. Symbol creation and symbolic consciousness operates first in mythic and expressive and exclusively social sensus communus. Symbols grow into cultures that increasingly refine themselves through sameness and difference, and symbols are the basis of any concrete, temporal consciousness, including historical consciousness. Auxier holds that symbolic reasoning is expressive, emotive, diachronic, and largely unreflective (capable even of falling below the threshold of conscious thought). Semiotic reasoning, by contrast, is largely reflective, cognitive, representational, and synchronic.

Auxier's theories of actuality, potentiality, and possibility derive from these distinctions. He argues that possibility should be thought of (hypothetically) as uncreated and unaffected by temporal passage. The same constellations of possibilities retain their intensive modes of order regardless of whether one constellation becomes an ingressing collection and informs what is actual. The same order is available, and in part intelligible to human beings, whether they are “might-have-beens” or  “might be's” and are indifferent to actuality. Potency is possibility limited by past actuality and wholly included in the constellations of possibility. Potency is defined as those immanent orderings of possibility not yet eliminated by present actuality. Potency draws its form from those collections of possibility that exemplify constellations whose status relative to actuality is “might-be.” Auxier argues that possibility is immediately experienced by human beings, and that its form is inferred by means of contrast with the experience of the “egress” of possibility. Actuality is cognized only indirectly.

Method and logic 
Auxier is a radical empiricist in method, following James, Bergson, and Whitehead. Radical empiricists hold that experience as human beings have it includes all the relations needed to bring it into adequate, applicable, and logically rigorous form. Radical empiricism requires that disjunctive and conjunctive relations be treated as equiprimordial, and insists that nothing in experience shall be excluded from philosophical consideration, even where its place in experience is not yet clear to us. The philosophical orientation of radical empiricism also forbids that a viewpoint may rely upon “transempirical or unempirical support for its assertions. Purely a priori or supernatural notions can be entertained as possibilities, but may form no part of the basis for a philosophy. Radical empiricism embraces fallibilism and the primacy of open-ended, non-monotonic, intensive reasoning. Auxier holds that the largely extensive forms of reasoning that characterize spatialized sign-operations are guided by reflective norms of thinking overlap with but are not identical to the norms of temporal, functional symbol-thinking. Symbolic thinking rarely yields to reflective norms except through long practice and habituation, and most reflective norms that establish criteria for evaluating good semiotic thinking are irrelevant to high-functioning symbol-thinking. One does not persuade a person of the value of a course of thinking by means of reflective norms, which are emotionally sterile. Persuasion requires the use of symbol functions.

Thus, Auxier's work in logic focuses on the relation between reflective and active thinking. Intensive logic is treated as the ground of all extensional logic, and extensional logic (along with all mathematical thinking above basic counting) is grounded in rearrangements of operational sign relations. Infinitely many extensional schemes are possible of the basis of intensive symbol functions, but all are well encompassed by the four-term semiotic schema Auxier provides. He treats Bergson's qualitative calculus and Whiteheads genetic and coordinate analyses as exemplars of his sign-theory. Auxier favors and teaches the analytical syllogistics of Delton Thomas Howard as a normative formalization of active thinking, and Susanne Langer's logic as an imaginative formalization of spatialized thinking, when removed from metaphysics and treated as a separate system of extensional thinking. Auxier emphasizes the role of imagination in symbol creation in line with Kantian and neo-Kantian theories, such as Cassirer's.

Philosophy of culture 
Auxier's theories in the philosophy of culture derive from the ideas of Giambattista Vico, Kant, F.W.J. Schelling, J.J. Bachofen, Friedrich Nietzsche,  Cassirer and a number of post-humanist critics, such as Michel Foucault, and Jacques Derrida. He holds that culture is not defined by any single source, such as language, but from multiple sources of experience that are continuous with the animal world, and even the “worlds” of plants and temporal processes that are non-biological. He argues that the organization of the cosmos in the broadest sense already includes not only the potentiality for life, but also for precisely the organizations of energies that characterize human life as dedicated to the creation of symbols and signs, as well as the modes of response we call “consciousness.” Thus, culture is an activity of animals (including but not limited to humans) in concert with and embedded form of potencies already characteristic of the physical universe and the modes of order it currently exhibits. Auxier follows Cassirer in holding that the human consciousness of the development of culture is conditioned by symbol creation, which proceeds along at least three fundamental lines: myth, language, and objectivating consciousness. But Auxier disagrees with Cassirer's emphasis upon the symbol as the criterion of difference between human and animal cognition, and argues that animals not only possess symbolic consciousness, but that human culture is unimaginable with the contributions of animal conscious, including human consciousness in its animal functions. Auxier also holds that consciousness wholly devoid of reflection may exist, although it would not exist in such a way as to preclude reflection in some remote temporal development.

Auxier holds that mythic consciousness endures as human culture is increasingly refined and is never far from the basis of human thinking. He holds that most human thinking is communal, embodied, and active, while individual thinking is most often a pathology of symbolic consciousness. Auxier opposes both old-style humanism and every form of individualism. The individual is not the inevitable and crowning jewel of cultural development, contrary to the views of Cassirer, Dewey and other classical liberals. Rather, the active, embodied community is the primary achievement of cultural activity. Auxier does not accept views of Western superiority or triumphalism as defensible philosophically. He holds that valuable life and fully human development is evident in traditional human life and that the individualism of the Western world is a tragic development. Here his views accord with those of Whitehead and Josiah Royce.

Auxier writes widely on popular culture and defends the aesthetic and philosophical importance of so-called “low culture,” such as jazz, blues and rock music, popular television and cinema, and best-selling fiction. He uses the vehicle of popular culture to explain and illustrate his more formal philosophical views, especially regarding aesthetics, ethics, and politics. Auxier sees popular culture as continuous with high culture and generally to be preferred over high culture as livelier and more important to the community as a whole.

Ethics and political philosophy 
In ethics and political philosophy, Auxier is a personalist. Following primarily the views of Royce, Borden Parker Bowne, Edgar Sheffield Brightman, and Martin Luther King, Jr.  Given that all human experience comes in the personal form, it is unproblematic to reason upon the assumption of the existence and value of persons. He does not assert that the impersonal does not exist or that person is the only value in the universe, only that all moral reasoning relevant to forming a moral philosophy is in fact conditioned by its source in the personal form of experience. Auxier holds that communities are persons in a more concrete and more enduring sense that are biological individuals. Individuals draw their personalities from the active nurture of their communities, but also come to transcend that activity and grow in directions not determined by the various agencies and institutions of their community of origin. The highest value of the community and the aim of social life is the fullest available determination of “the beloved community” (Royce, King), which is wholly actual in the present, but left vague by the unwillingness of the community to act on it. Auxier understands the beloved community upon the transcendental logic of Jean-Jacques Rousseau's idea of “the general will”: that in every social circumstance there exists an optimal course of action, and that course of action is the general will (what people would each and all choose if they could discern it). The beloved community is the general will, Auxier holds. He allows that corporations and other historical institutions are indeed persons, but often dysfunctional persons whose community values and structures beget alienated and pathological individuals.

Auxier holds, contrary to classical liberalism, that politics is a subdivision of ethics and cannot be divorced from human moral life. He holds that the dignity of personality is the highest value in the field of values humans are capable of recognizing, and includes the ani mal and plant worlds as forms of existence that exemplify in some degree, however slight, personality. Auxier insists that humans are morally obliged to remain open to the possibility that personality characterizes the whole order of the cosmos, not just the portion regarded as living or human, and must consider that possibility in forming and enacting their ethical (including political) values. Auxier is a communitarian and sympathizes with the ideas of such classical conservatives as David Hume, Adam Smith, and Edmund Burke, insofar as they agree that meaningful change is always slow, what happens to the least in the community happens to the whole community, that economic development must include in its very conception the entire community. He holds with Royce and Gifford Pinchot that conservation of nature is the basis of democratic life and that whatever damages nature also damages democracy. He holds that communities which produce independent individuals will both benefit from that process and suffer from the inevitable betrayals that strong individuals choose, in their tragic isolation.

Auxier teaches and advocates a version of nonviolence that derives from both King and Mohandas Gandhi. He argues that almost every problem confronted by human beings, individually and collectively, are solved without the use of violence and that therefore resorting to violence is an aberration in human experience. This is why it requires justifications that always rely upon the logic of exceptionalism. Auxier argues that one hundred percent of human problems can be solved without violence and that the use of violence never genuinely solves any human problem.

Aesthetics 
Auxier holds that aesthetic feeling is the basis for both meaning and symbol creation. He defends a view of images that draws from Bergson's account in Matter and Memory (1898).  The movement of images is prior to the experience of them by localized, temporal centers of action (including human selves).  A prehended feeling (or fundamental relation) is responded to by other feeling, each creating a fleeting presentational space that arrests the encounter of images. Through the creation of increasingly deep presentational spaces, images accrue histories of feelings and responses, building intensive histories of achievement. In the higher phases of this process, with intensities within intensities many times embedded in increasingly complex and temporally delicate spaces of presentation, reversions of feeling begin to create leaps between and among spatialized repositories of past feeling. To traverse these spaces, immediate encounters with possibility must be tapped to give form to a relation across primal presentational spaces. The active over-determination of images, their restriction within a unified space, is a condition for these leaps among base images (this is Auxier's interpretation of Cassirer's basis phenomena, joined to a Whiteheadian theory of symbolic reference). The over-determination of an image comes at the cost of “error” in Whitehead's sense of the word, which is the cost of transmuting temporal processes into spatial relations.

The process of active thinking in human beings is a process of error by over-determination of images. The formation of symbols from fundamental feeling is the process of determination, but it can be carried out without full conceptualization. Symbols are fundamentally open and infinitely interpretable. Concepts are always erroneous over-determinations of feeling carried out as a condition of conforming the symbols to the requirements of reflection. Symbols are made into signs and signs are the basic units of reflective activity. The creative arrangement of signs follows a kind of reflective intuition (Bergson) or secondary reflection (Gabriel Marcel) that provides a feeling of creative power that is basic to the creation of art. Auxier rejects the idea that genuine art can be created without reflection. The experience of aesthetic space in reflective intuition is also the basis of the human recognition of beauty in nature. The feeling is, as Kant described, one of feeling as if nature's balanced asymmetries were already adapted to the forms of human sensation, and for the delight of the cognizing person. The development and deployment of symbols for the stimulation of the senses in accordance with the forms of reflective intuition is the basic activity of all artists, according to Auxier.

Auxier has argued that music has a singular place in the formation of both human feeling and human culture. He follows the aesthetic theory of Susanne Langer in this regard, but departs from her understanding of the relation of time with rhythm and feeling, especially where Langer fails to recognize the complementarity between her views of image and Bergson's views. For Auxier the musical images are fundamentally hybrid units existing both in rhythmic repetition and acoustic space. The space is, as Langer asserts, virtual, but it is more than a “semblance” or “primary illusion.” The experience of the egress of possibility in musical experience is what forms the auditory image and then leaves behind not a sound but a tone. The existence of the tone requires reflection both to create and to hear, and is thoroughly virtual. However, the unheard context of the tone egresses and constitutes the ground of the intelligibility of the tone. Auxier holds that visual images are much more complex and mediated, by comparison, and that the most likely hypothesis about our experience of visual images and the virtual space in which they exist for our perception, is that humans learned to create this space by generalizing from their experience of the contrast between sounds and tones. Tones are concrete symbols. Musical notes are semiotic determinations of these tones.

Philosophy of science 
Auxier applies his metaphysics, logic, ethics and aesthetics to the critique of science by opposing reductionist and model-centric versions of scientific knowledge. He defends the principle of evolution but writes against Darwinism and other narrow versions of the science. Where evolutionary science crosses into making philosophical claims unsupported by the science itself, Auxier calls scientific theorists back toward humbler conclusions that genuinely carry scientific warrant. He also writes against Einstein's philosophical conclusions drawn from the theory of General Relativity, which Auxier regards as primarily a philosophical rather than a scientific theory. Auxier favors open and temporalist ideas in science, and sympathizes with the physics of the quantum vacuum and the evolutionary theories that see continuity between the physical creation of spaces of life and biological developments along particular lines.
Auxier's theory of the quantum of explanation, developed with Gary L. Herstein, holds that all explanation (especially scientific explanation) depends upon a structure, called “the quantum” (following Whitehead's usage) drawn from concrete reality and hypothesized as an irreducible unit for the purposes of some determinate inquiry. While Auxier and Herstein are realists in science, they are realists about this quantum, which they hold to be basic to the structure of both cognition and understanding. The quantum is, in Auxier's view, an overdetermined image modeled precisely and carefully to serve as the exact unit which is irreducibly present in the whole which is to be explained. Explanation thus moves from the analysis of a presupposed coordinate whole by means of a genetic specification of the order immanent in the quantum. Thus, all scientific knowledge proceeds by a kind of mereotopology, by the creation of s suitable space of explanation and a re-enactment of its primary characters according to the complex features immanent in the quantum. The ability to identify and describe a quantum for these purposes is a kind of talent that some people possess as a refinement of their aesthetic reflective intuition. Thus, scientific genius is no less aesthetic in character than artistic genius, in Auxier's view.

Theology and philosophy of religion 
Auxier holds that theology must be done in accordance with the methods and norms of philosophy and that even when theology is the source of new methods and forms of analysis (for example, Duns Scotus's theory of transcendentals or Friedrich Scheiermacher's hermeneutics), these methods and forms must be judged according to philosophical rather than theological norms. Thus, while religious practice in no ways depends upon theology, theology is completely dependent at the level of norms and methods (not content) on philosophy. Good theology must therefore be first and foremost philosophically sound. Theology takes on at the level of faith the assumption of the existence of divinity, of revelation, and of the reality of the good. Upon these three suppositions, theology may proceed along paths that philosophy does not travel. With Royce Auxier holds that doing philosophy does depend upon an act of philosophical faith in the intelligibility to us of the universe, but this requires no idea of divinity, revelation, or the good; it requires only an idea of the whole, of insight into that whole, and of the better and worse, not of good or evil.
Auxier defends a pluralistic and culturally embedded ideal of human religious life, holding that ritual, which is found in the animal world in full continuity with the human world, viewed as a version of animality. Auxier argues that myth is superadded to ritual as an independent companion to it, making a second aesthetic level tinged with reflection available to humans who enact rituals. He rejects the claim that myth developed to explain ritual as an overly reductive and unknowable hypothesis. Auxier argues that the experience we call “religious” in the higher phases of experience is not reducible either to aesthetic or to cognitive experience and is a distinctive and nearly universal characteristic of human life.
Auxier holds that religious experience can be engendered both through the repetition of rituals and through the experience of novelty (in nature or other cultures), but the novelty must be integrated into the familiar patterns in order for the feeling of value it carries to be retained. Thus Auxier believes that the religious community in which a human being is raised becomes the basis for the integration of future religious experiences that are not explicit in the experience of that community. His theology would generally be identified as liberal and Protestant, but along the Arminian and Wesleyan lines of Protestantism. Auxier commonly criticizes Calvinist views in his writings, sometimes quite harshly.

Politics and activism 
Beginning with his musical explorations during his residence in Atlanta, Auxier became active in environmental causes and simultaneously in politics. These activities included protesting the First Gulf War, and every subsequent war the US has prosecuted, as well as various other forms of social injustice and oppression. His commitment to nonviolence, environmental conservation, and community localism has led him to participate, organize, speak, and perform music at hundreds of events and for many causes. He visited the imprisoned to spread music in Oklahoma and Illinois, as well as visiting nursing homes and homes for the developmentally disabled, most often as a musician.
Auxier joined the Illinois Education Association in 2000 and was elected to the Departmental Representatives Council, supporting the SIU Faculty Association during collective bargaining cycles of 2001 and 2003. In 2006 Auxier was drafted to join the bargaining team for the SIUC FA and served in that role through the completion of the 2006-2010 agreement. Resuming this role for the 2010-2014 contract, Auxier was among the leaders of the SIUCFA that went on strike, November 3–9, 2011. The strike successfully produced a new agreement. the Illinois Educational Labor Relations Board later adjudicated the administration and Board of Trustees of SIUC of bargaining in bad faith, bringing about the strike, and required them to pay a 1.7 million dollar settlement. Auxier testified at these proceedings and assisted the claimant's legal team, the Illinois Education Association. Auxier remains as an active member of the IEA.

In 2000 Auxier joined the Green Party, Shawnee Chapter. As an environmentalist he fought road development, Walmart and other issues in the community, challenging local government and business interests over development plans. Auxier spoke from his radio show, wrote for local papers, spoke and played at rallies and meetings, and participated in the electoral efforts of the Green Party. In 2016, Auxier ran as a recognized Green Party candidate for Jackson County Board, District 3, and received 6% of the vote, establishing the Green Party in that district. In October 2017 Auxier was caucused, in Nashville, Illinois, as the recognized candidate of the Shawnee Green Party to run for US Congress, 12th District of Illinois, where the Green Party is an established party by state electoral requirements. His candidacy became official December 4, 2016 and has been endorsed by the Illinois Green Party.

Publications

Books
The Quantum of Explanation: Whitehead's Radical Empiricism, co-author (2017)
The Philosophy of Umberto Eco, co-editor (2017)
Metaphysical Graffiti: Deep Cuts in the Philosophy of Rock, author (2017)
The Philosophy of Hilary Putnam, co-editor (2015)
Time, Will and Purpose: Living Ideas from the Philosophy of Josiah Royce, author (Open Court, 2013)
The Philosophy of Arthur C. Danto, co-editor (Open Court, 2013)
The Philosophy of Richard Rorty, co-editor (Open Court, 2010)
Bruce Springsteen and Philosophy: Darkness on the Edge of Truth, co-editor, contributor (Open Court, 2008)
The Wizard of Oz and Philosophy: Wicked Wisdom of the West, co-editor, contributor (Open Court, 2008)
The Philosophy of Michael Dummett, co-editor (Open Court, 2007)
The Philosophy of Jaakko Hintikka, co-editor (Open Court, 2006)
The Philosophy of Marjorie Grene, co-editor (Open Court, 2003)
The Philosophy of Seyyed Hossein Nasr, co-editor (Open Court, 2001)
Critical Responses to the Philosophy of Josiah Royce, editor (Thoemmes Press, 2001)
Hartshorne and Brightman on God, Process, and Persons: The Correspondence, co-editor, contributor (Vanderbilt University Press, 2000)

Journals 
 Eidos: A Journal for Philosophy of Culture, deputy chief editor (2017–present)
 SUNY Series in American Philosophical and Cultural Thought, co-editor (2016–present)
The Library of Living Philosophers, editor (2001-2013)
The Pluralist, editor (2006-2012)
The Personalist Forum, editor (1997-2006)

References

External links
Auxier's Curriculum Vita
 Faculty profile
Auxier's academia.edu page
Official website of The Pluralist
Website of the Library of Living Philosophers
Open Court Library of Living Philosophers
A Dialogue on Bergson
Imagination and Historical Knowledge in Vico
The River: A Vichian Dialogue on Humanistic Education
God, Process, and Persons
Straussian Descendant? The Historicist Renewal
Susanne Langer on Symbols and Analogy
Auxier at Radically Empirical
AIPCT founding interview
AIPCT Daily Egyptian interview
Auxier interview on faculty strike

1961 births
Living people
University of Memphis alumni
Emory University alumni
Oklahoma City University faculty
Southern Illinois University faculty
People from Leitchfield, Kentucky
Candidates in the 2018 United States elections